Virginia Avenue Park is a  park located in the Pico neighborhood of Santa Monica, California. Originally opened in 1976, the park was redeveloped and expanded in the 1990s and early 2000s, reopening in 2005. The park hosts a number of community activities such as a weekly farmers market, afterschool programs, and social program assistance. The park is also home to the Pico Branch Library and the Thelma Terry community center.

History
The original  park was purchased by the City of Santa Monica in 1975 and opened in 1976.  In 1980, the city opened the Thelma Terry community center.

In the early-1990s, the city began planning to redevelop the park. The redevelopment process was delayed however by the city's decision to purchase an additional  lot adjacent to the park. By 1999, the city had selected   Koning Eizenberg Architecture to lead the redevelopment effort and approved a $13 million budget for the project. The redevelopment was completed in 2005. Notably, following redevelopment, the Park was the first park in the United States to achieve LEED Silver certification.

In 2014, the park became the new site of the Pico Branch Library, one of the most popular library branches in Santa Monica.

Facilities & events
The park hosts a wide array of facilities including:
 The Thelma Terry community center
 The Teen Center
 The Patio
 The Splash Pad
 The Pico Branch Library
 Basketball courts
 Playgrounds

The park also hosts a number of community events such as a weekly farmers market, afterschool programs, and social program assistance. In recent years, the park has also played host to community events marking Juneteenth and Dia de los Muertos.

Awards
Following redevelopment, the park received several awards, including:
 2007  LA Business Council Architectural Award, Landscape Architecture
 2007  Westside Prize Urban Solutions/Built, Westside Urban Forum
 2006  Municipal Award of Merit, US Green Building Council

References

External links
Official website

Parks in Los Angeles County, California
Santa Monica, California
Municipal parks in California
Parks in Santa Monica, California